A screw cap or closure is a common type of closure for bottles, jars, and tubes.

Usage

A screw closure is a mechanical device which is screwed on and off of a "finish" on a container. Either continuous threads or lugs are used.  It must be engineered to be cost-effective, to provide an effective seal (and barrier), to be compatible with the contents, to be easily opened by the consumer, often to be reclosable, and to comply with product, package, and environmental laws and regulations.  Some closures need to be tamper resistant and have child-resistant packaging features. A tamper-evident band is a common tamper warning for screw caps of bottles, for example.

Wine industry

Screw caps' use as an alternative to cork for sealing wine bottles is gaining increasing support. A screw cap is a metal cap that screws onto threads on the neck of a bottle, generally with a metal skirt down the neck to resemble the traditional wine capsule ("foil"). A layer of plastic (often PVDC), cork, rubber, or other soft material is used as wad to make a seal with the mouth of the bottle.

Sake industry
Sake bottles are almost universally closed with screw caps (some are packed in barrels, or novelty bottles).

See also
 Bottle cap
 Child-resistant packaging
 Closure & Container Manufacturers Association
 Closure (container)
 Flip-top
 Packaging
 Permeation
 Screw cap (wine)
 GPI container finish standards which includes screw caps for glass containers.

Sources

 Soroka, W, "Fundamentals of Packaging Technology", IoPP, 2002, 
 Yam, K. L., "Encyclopedia of Packaging Technology", John Wiley & Sons, 2009, 
Prlewe, J. Wine from Grape to Glass. NY: Abbeville Press, 1999.
 Wayne J. Mortensen and Brian K. Marks, The Failure of a Wine Closure Innovation: A Strategic Marketing Analysis ,
 ASTM D3474 Standard Practice for Calibration and Use of Torque Meters Used in Packaging Applications

External links
 New Zealand Screw Cap Initiative

Wine packaging and storage
Packaging